Genevieve Nicole Padalecki (née Cortese) (born January 8, 1981) is an American actress.  She appeared in the television series Wildfire as Kris Furillo and had a recurring role in Supernatural as the demon Ruby.

Life and career
Cortese  was born in  San Francisco, California. She has two brothers, Johnny  and Ben, and a sister, Sarah. At the age of 13, she moved to Montana, and later to Sun Valley, Idaho. She holds a BA in English and a BFA degree in drama from the Tisch School of the Arts, New York University.

Before making her television debut as Kris Furillo, she performed in regional theater productions of A Midsummer Night's Dream, One Flew Over the Cuckoo's Nest, Crimes of the Heart, and Joseph and the Amazing Technicolor Dreamcoat. 

On September 14, 2020, it was announced that Cortese was cast in a recurring role in The CW's crime drama series Walker, a reboot of the original television show of Walker, Texas Ranger, and will play the role Emily Walker, the late wife of Cordell Walker (who is played by her husband Jared Padalecki). The series premiered on January 21, 2021.

Personal life
Cortese met actor Jared Padalecki when she had a recurring role on the show Supernatural during its fourth season, replacing Katie Cassidy, who previously played the role. She went on to make a guest appearance in the sixth season as a fictionalized version of herself. Padalecki proposed to her in front of their favorite painting, "Joan of Arc" by French realist Jules Bastien-Lepage, at New York's Metropolitan Museum of Art in October 2009. The engagement was announced in January 2010. The pair married on February 27, 2010, in Cortese's hometown of Sun Valley, Idaho. On October 10, 2011, the couple announced that they were expecting their first child together. Their son was born on March 19, 2012. On December 22, 2013, Cortese gave birth to their second son. Their daughter was born on March 17, 2017. The couple resides in Austin, Texas, with their three children.

Filmography

Film

Television

References

External links

 

1981 births
21st-century American actresses
People from Sun Valley, Idaho
Actresses from Idaho 
American film actresses
American stage actresses
American television actresses
Living people
Tisch School of the Arts alumni